The 2014 European Fencing Championships were held in Strasbourg, France from 7–14 June 2014 at the Rhénus Sport.

Schedule

Medal summary

Men's events

Women's events

Medal table

Results

Men

Épée individual

Foil individual

Sabre individual

Épée team

Foil team

Sabre team

Women

Épée individual

Foil individual

Sabre individual

Épée team

Foil team

Sabre team

References

External links

Official website

2014
European Fencing Championships
European Fencing Championships
2014 European Fencing Championships
International fencing competitions hosted by France